Corhampton and Meonstoke is a civil parish in the English county of Hampshire forming part of the area administered as the City of Winchester. It comprises the villages of Corhampton and Meonstoke.

History 
The parish was formed on 1 April 1932 from the parishes of "Corhampton" and "Meonstoke".

References

Civil parishes in Winchester